Richard Green Parker (December 25, 1798 – September 25, 1869) was a United States educator and a history and textbook writer.

Biography
Born in Boston, he was the son of Episcopal clergyman Samuel Parker, who was appointed bishop of Massachusetts toward the end of his life, but never served in that capacity. Richard Green Parker graduated from Harvard in 1817. His subsequent life was devoted to education, chiefly in New England. He was not only a thorough practical teacher in grammar schools, and a private school of his own, but was also a voluminous author of textbooks.

Works

Textbooks
 Natural Philosophy (1837)
 Aids to English Composition (Boston, 1832)
 National Series of Readers, with James M. Watson (completed in 1858)

Histories
History of the Grammar School in East Parish, Roxbury (Boston, 1826)
A Tribute to the Life and Character of Jonas Chickering (Boston, William P. Tewksbury, 1854)

Notes

References

External links
  Obituary.
 
 
 

1798 births
1869 deaths
American educators
American non-fiction writers
Harvard University alumni
Writers from Boston